Liptovský Mikuláš (until 1952 Liptovský Svätý Mikuláš,) is a town in northern Slovakia, on the Váh River, about  from Bratislava. It lies in the Liptov region, in Liptov Basin near the Low Tatra and Tatra mountains. The town, known as Liptovský Svätý Mikuláš (or Liptovský Saint Nicholas) before communist times, is also renowned as a town of guilds and culture.

History
From the second half of the 10th century until 1918, it was part of the Kingdom of Hungary. The town of Mikuláš (Liptószentmiklós) was first mentioned in the royal deed of King Ladislaus IV in 1286. The first written record mentioning the Church of Saint Nicolaus which was to become the founding element of a larger settlement dates back to 1299. The Church of Saint Nicolaus is the oldest building in the town of Liptovský Mikuláš.

Mikuláš was one of the foremost important centers of crafts in the Liptov region. The craftsmen formed guilds; the oldest guild was the shoemaker's guild mentioned in 1508. There were also other guilds: the guild of smiths, furriers, tailors, hatters and butchers.

In 1677, Liptovský Mikuláš (Liptószentmiklós) became the seat of the local district, as well as Liptó county. The legendary Slovak "Robin Hood" Juraj Jánošík was sentenced and executed here in 1713 by being hung by the ribcage on a hook.

Liptovský Mikuláš played an important role for Slovaks in the 19th century during the period of magyarization. It was one of the centers of Slovak national movement. The first Slovak theater,  "The theater of G. F. Belopotocký" was founded there in 1830. Liptovský Mikuláš was a home to an important Slovak romantic poet and national activist, Janko Kráľ, who was fighting for the right of self-determination of Slovak nation in the Hungarian Empire. Also another national revivalist Michal Miloslav Hodža lived there. The leader of Slovak national revival, Ľudovít Štúr, publicly revealed a document called "The demands of Slovak nation" in 1848 in Liptovský Mikuláš as an official appeal to the leaders of Austrian-Hungarian empire to help solve the present existentional problems of Slovak people (unsuccessful).

In the 20th century, many once independent villages were annexed to Liptovský Mikuláš. Thus, what was once the bucolic farmers' hamlet of Vrbica is now simply a street in the middle of the town.

Tourism
The town is one of the most famous tourist centers in Slovakia because of its rich cultural life and also because it is a perfect starting point for tourists, from where it is easy to reach the Low Tatras (Demänová valley) with well-known caves such as the Demänová Ice Cave or Demänová Cave of Freedom, or to the Western Tatras. Folk architecture can also be seen nearby in Vlkolínec near Ružomberok, or Pribylina, a few kilometers west of the town, and for recreation, the lake called Liptovská Mara is available. Since 2004 a new aquapark called Aquapark Tatralandia has been open. The area is also well-known due to its location close to the biggest ski resort in Slovakia, Jasná. Many modern lifts and recent additions made to its infrastructure have meant it has become a popular ski center for many western tourists over the last few years.

Demographics
According to the 2001 census, the town had 33,007 inhabitants. 94.07% of inhabitants were Slovaks, 2.30% Roma, 2.10% Czech and 0.28% Hungarians. The religious make-up was 34.48% Catholics, 32.26% people with no religious affiliation, and 26.85% Lutherans.
According to the Hungarian census of 1910, the population make up was 50% Slovak, 30% Hungarian 20% German. After World War II, the ethnic minorities were expelled leaving a majority Slovak population.

Sport
Ice hockey club HK 1932 Liptovský Mikuláš represents the city in Tipos extraliga.

The Ondrej Cibak Whitewater Slalom Course on the nearby Váh river is the oldest whitewater slalom course in Slovakia. The 2008 Olympic champion in canoe slalom, C-1, Michal Martikán was born and lives here. Also Elena Kaliská, another Olympic winner, is a member of the town sports club.

Petra Vlhová, born and raised in the city, won the alpine skiing slalom gold medal at the 2022 Winter Olympics. As a child she attended many training at a ski center at Podbreziny hill of the city. Martina Dubovská also trained at the center in her childhood. The ski center at Podbreziny was established in 1993 and was discontinued gradually in early 2010s. In 2022, it was restored and re-entered into usage. The tracks combine to a total length of 550 meters at peak altitude of 700 meters.

Liptovský Mikuláš hosted the 2012 FAI World Championship for Space Models, taking place from 31 August to 9 September.

Transport
Liptovský Mikuláš is located near the main Slovak D1 motorway, as well as being on the main railroad from Bratislava to Košice. The closest international airport is in Poprad. The town also has its own public transport network with 13 lines operating.

Twin towns — sister cities

Liptovský Mikuláš is twinned with:

 Annecy, France
 Bačka Palanka, Serbia
 Galanta, Slovakia
 Kalamaria, Greece
 Kemi, Finland
 Kiskőrös, Hungary
 Michalovce, Slovakia
 Opava, Czech Republic
 Terchová, Slovakia
 Żywiec, Poland
 Anzio,  Italy
 Cluj-Napoca,  Romania

People 

 Jozef Božetech Klemens (1817), painter
 Janko Kráľ (1822), poet
 Samuel Nemessányi (1837), Hungarian luthier, a maker of stringed instruments
 Ján Levoslav Bella (1843), composer
 Aurel Stodola (1859), physicist
 Samuel Fischer (1859), publisher
 Slavoljub Eduard Penkala (1871), engineer, inventor
 Ivan Stodola (1888), poet, dramatist, doctor
 Martin Rázus (1888, Vrbica), priest, author, politician
 Janko Alexy (1894), painter
 Koloman Sokol (1902), painter
 Mária Rázusová-Martáková (1905), author
 Ladislav Hanus (1907), philosopher, theologian, author
 Pavol Strauss (1912), doctor, writer, essayist, translator
 Ivan Laučík  (1944), poet, professor
 Michal Martikán (1979), sportsman
 Simon Naschér (1841–1901), rabbi, writer
 Peter Sejna (1979), AHL/NHL player
 Martin Cibák (1980), 2004 Stanley cup winner with Tampa Bay Lightning
 Milan Jurčina (1983), NHL player
 Diana Doll (1976), model
 Petra Vlhová (1995), ski racer
 Klaudia Medlová (1993), professional snowboarder / Olympian

Images

References
Notes

External links

Official website
Website of Slovak Caves Administration
Liptovský Mikuláš accommodation

Cities and towns in Slovakia
Villages and municipalities in Liptovský Mikuláš District
Geography of Žilina Region